Bledlow-cum-Saunderton is a civil parish in the Wycombe district of Buckinghamshire, England.  It contains the villages of Bledlow, Bledlow Ridge and Saunderton and the hamlets of Crownfield, Forty Green, Holly Green, Pitch Green, Rout's Green, Saunderton Lee and Skittle Green. It had a population of 2,469 according to the 2011 census.

References

Civil parishes in Buckinghamshire

Bledlow Parish Church